Miguel Duhamel (born May 26, 1967) is a Canadian former professional motorcycle racer. He is the son of Canadian Motorsport Hall of Fame member Yvon Duhamel. He is tied with Toni Elias for the fourth-winningest rider in the AMA Superbike series with 32 wins (Mat Mladin is #1 with 82, Josh Hayes is #2 with 61, and Cameron Beaubier is #3 with 38). Duhamel was inducted into the AMA Motorcycle Hall of Fame in 2016.

Racing career
Born in LaSalle, Quebec, Duhamel began his professional racing career in 1988. He raced for Honda in the FIM Endurance Cup and for Team Suzuki in the Canadian Superbike Championship. He also rode a limited AMA 250 Grand Prix schedule. Duhamel won his first AMA Superbike race in 1990 at Heartland Park Topeka, and was the AMA Superbike Rookie of the Year.

Duhamel won the 1991 Daytona 200, when he replaced the injured Randy Renfrow. He also won seven races en route to winning the AMA 600cc SuperSport Championship. He won the 1992 FIM World Endurance Team Championship with Team Kawasaki France. He finished twelfth in the 500cc Grand Prix World Championship that year for Team Yamaha France, the only time he raced at this level.

He was the 1993 AMA 600cc SuperSport Champion on a Kawasaki after winning seven races. He won the AMA Superbike final at Sears Point by beating Doug Polen by inches. In 1994, Harley-Davidson selected Duhamel to race its VR1000 Superbike. He led parts of the Mid-Ohio and Brainerd Superbike finals, which were the only times the Harley VR1000 led an AMA Superbike race.

Duhamel became the first Canadian to win the AMA Superbike title in 1995. He was named the 1995 AMA Pro Athlete of the Year. He had six consecutive AMA Superbike wins, which broke Wayne Rainey's record of five victories. Duhamel also dominated the 600 SuperSport Championship by winning nine of the 11 events. His eight straight victories broke Doug Polen's record. Duhamel finished third and fourth at the U.S. round of World Superbike, mirroring the results of teammate Mike Hale.

In 1996, he became the winningest rider in SuperSport with his 28th career victory. Duhamel won his fourth 600cc SuperSport Championship, after reaching the podium in all but three events. Duhamel won four Superbike races (Daytona, Pomona, Homestead, and Loudon) and had six podium finishes in ten events.

He won another 600 SuperSport title in 1997. He had five wins and two additional podium finishes on the way to his fifth series Championship. He had four wins in Superbike, and he finished second in the points. As in 1996, it was Doug Chandler who beat him for the AMA Superbike title.

Duhamel won four Superbike races in 1998 before he had a season-ending accident while qualifying at New Hampshire International Speedway. He had also scored two second-place finishes. He won the 600 SuperSport race at Sears Point. He still had lingering injuries as the 1999 season started. He stunned the crowd by winning both the AMA Superbike and 600 Supersport events at the season-opening Daytona 200 races. He had a second-place finish at Sears Point in the 600 SuperSport race before his season was cut short by crashing at Road Atlanta.

Duhamel won the 2000 Brainerd event in the Superbike Championship. He also won the Road America event for Honda. He had four 2001 AMA Superbike podium finishes for Honda. He won AMA SuperSport races at Daytona, Mid-Ohio, and Brainerd. Duhamel swept both 2002 events at Road America. He also had five Superbike podium finishes en route to finishing third in the Superbike points.

In 2003, Duhamel was with American Honda. He earned his fourth AMA Superbike victory at Daytona and made seven additional podium appearances in the series. He also raced in AMA Supersport, taking a win at Brainerd International Raceway and two additional series podium finishes. Duhamel won the Daytona 200 in 2004. He had seven additional podium finishes. He had a Supersport victory at Brainerd and two additional podium finishes. He won the 2004 AMA Formula Xtreme Championship.

Duhamel won the 2005 AMA Formula Xtreme Championship with four wins and five second-place finishes in nine events. He battled Jake Zemke in a close race for the Championship. In Superbike, he had podium finishes at Road Atlanta and Mid-Ohio on his Honda.

He had a wildcard ride for Gresini Honda at the United States Grand Prix held on July 22, 2007 at Mazda Raceway Laguna Seca, replacing the injured Toni Elías. He pulled out of the MotoGP race early because he was unable to get a feel for the unfamiliar Honda RC212V he was riding. He also raced the AMA Superbike round at the same meeting  Duhamel had a crash while practicing at Road Atlanta on August 8, 2007. He suffered a lacerated liver, and a perforated and bruised lung.

In 2008, Duhamel again raced for the Factory Honda Superbike team in AMA Superbike, riding a CBR1000RR-based Superbike, and he scored five top-five finishes. Duhamel finished seventh in the 2008 AMA Superbike points standings. In 2012, Miguel won the FIM e-Power & TTXGP race despite a three-year break from competition. The Canadian had lost nothing of his will to win as he rode the US Barracuda Lightning Racing Team's electric motorcycle.

In February 2016, Miguel Duhamel announced that he would come out of retirement to race in the Bol d'Or Classic endurance race in France held on September 15–17, 2016.

Career statistics

Grand Prix motorcycle racing
All stats from MotoGP.com

Races by year
(key)

References

External links

Miguel Duhamel at the AMA Hall of Fame

Photographs
Miguel Duhamel Website
Biography at the official AMA Pro website
Honda Racing biography

1968 births
Canadian motorcycle racers
Living people
Sportspeople from Montreal
500cc World Championship riders
AMA Superbike Championship riders
People from LaSalle, Quebec
French Quebecers
Superbike World Championship riders
Gresini Racing MotoGP riders
MotoGP World Championship riders